Dudley James Vincent Hamilton-Miller (28 March 1904 – 15 July 1984) was a croquet player from England.

Dudley Hamilton-Miller won the Open Championship twice (1938 and 1946) and the President's Cup once in 1946.
As an administrator, Hamilton-Miller served on the Council of the Croquet Association between 1966 and 1983.
Hamilton-Miller represented England in the 1950–51 MacRobertson Shield tournament in New Zealand.

References

External links
The Croquet Records website

1904 births
1984 deaths
English croquet players